Zero is the fifth studio album by American rock band Hawthorne Heights, released on June 25, 2013. It's their first album to be released through Red Entertainment. The album was produced by Brian Virtue.

Promotion and release
It was announced early 2013 that the band signed deal with Red Entertainment and that a new album is in the works. They put their final EP from their Hate/Hope Trilogy on hold, so they can work on a new album. They financed the entire project via pledgemusic. The album debuted at 118th place on the Billboard 200. It is also the band's last studio album to feature drummer Eron Bucciarelli and guitarist Micah Carli.

Songs and singles released
On May 18, 2013 the first single "Golden Parachutes" was released. The song impacted radio on May 28, 2013.
On June 11, 2013 they released their second song "Taken By The Dark" which contains a heavier side including screams from Micah.

Album title
The band explained: "We went in with a bunch of songs and came out with a concept album, the likes of which we’ve never attempted to undertake in the past. If you’re a long-time fan of Hawthorne Heights, you know we’ve been through a lot over the years. No matter how hard life gets or how many seemingly insurmountable odds you may encounter, everyone can get a fresh start. “ZERO” deals with these life issues against a dystopian, war-ravaged backdrop".

Track listing

Personnel
Hawthorne Heights
JT Woodruff – lead vocals
Micah Carli – lead and rhythm guitars, unclean vocals
Matt Ridenour – bass, backing vocals
Eron Bucciarelli – drums, percussion
Mark McMillon – rhythm and lead guitars, backing vocals
Production
Album produced by Brian Virtue
Art Direction & Design by Jeff Chenault

References

Hawthorne Heights albums
2013 albums